Rye House Power Station is a 715 MW combined cycle gas turbine (CCGT) power station close to Rye House railway station in Hoddesdon, Hertfordshire.

History
The current station was built on the site of an earlier 128 MW coal-fired power station built in 1951, and an open cycle gas turbine plant commissioned in 1965 (see below). Both these stations were closed on 1 November 1982 and were subsequently demolished.

The gas-fired station, near Hoddesdon, is about eighteen miles north of London, was built in the early 1990s and fully commissioned in November 1993 and officially opened in April 1994. Output from the station is enough to meet the daily power needs of nearly a million people - almost the population of Hertfordshire.

Rye House is owned and operated by VPI, part of the Vitol group.

Specification
Rye House was built by Siemens AG. It has three Siemens V94.2 gas turbines rotating at 3000 rpm. Each drives a generator producing 150 MW at a terminal voltage of 11 kV and exhausts at 540 °C into a Babcock Energy steam generator. The three steam generators supply a single Siemens turbogenerator producing 250 MW at 15.75 kV. The combined outputs feed the National Grid at 400 kV. The station has the largest air-cooled condenser in Europe. The chimneys are 58 m high. The station employs thirty-seven people.

Previous power stations

The 128 MW coal-fired Rye House power station was built by the British Electricity Authority (later the Central Electricity Generating Board) and was commissioned in 1951. The station was located between the London to Cambridge railway line and the Lee Navigation, providing access for the delivery of coal and a water supply for condensing steam in the plant. The building was designed by the architect Sir Giles Gilbert Scott in a steel-framed, brick-clad ‘cathedral of power’ style exemplified by Scott's Battersea and Bankside power stations.

The station had single chimney and three reinforced concrete cooling towers. Each tower had a capacity of 1.3 million gallons per hour (1.64 m3/s). A dock was built on the Lee Navigation adjacent to the power station for unloading coal in addition to the railway sidings.

The station comprised four 30 MW Richardsons Westgarth-Parsons turbo-alternators, generating at 33 kV. These were supplied with steam from the Babcock pulverised coal boilers which produced a total of 1.4 million pounds per hour (176.4 kg/s) of steam at 600 psi (41.4 bar) and 454 °C.

In 1965, an open cycle gas turbine power station was built adjacent to the steam station. This comprised two 70 MW oil-fired gas turbine/generator sets. This was a peak shaving plant designed to operate at times of maximum demand.

The output from the steam plant and the gas turbine plant are shown in the following charts.

Rye House (steam) power station output 1954–1982 in GWh.Rye House (gas turbine) power station output 1965–1982 in GWh.Rye House power station was decommissioned on 1 November 1982. It was subsequently demolished and then replaced by the CCGT station.

See also

 Energy policy of the United Kingdom
 Energy use and conservation in the United Kingdom

References

External links

 Other CCGTs in eastern England
 Photos of station on geograph

Natural gas-fired power stations in England
Buildings and structures in Hertfordshire
Power stations in the East of England
Hoddesdon